The Real Housewives of Beverly Hills is an American reality television series that premiered on Bravo on October 14, 2010. Developed as the sixth installment in the network's The Real Housewives franchise.

The series twelfth season chronicles eight women in Beverly Hills; Kyle Richards, Lisa Rinna, Erika Jayne, Dorit Kemsley, Garcelle Beauvais, Crystal Kung Minkoff, Sutton Stracke (all returning from season eleven), and Diana Jenkins —as they balance their personal and professional lives, along with their social circle.

Former cast members featured over the previous ten seasons are; Taylor Armstrong (1-3), Camille Grammer (1-2), Adrienne Maloof (1-3), Kim Richards (1-5), Lisa Vanderpump (1-9), Brandi Glanville (3-5), Yolanda Hadid (3-6), Carlton Gebbia (4), Joyce Giraud (4), Eileen Davidson (5-7), Kathryn Edwards (6), Teddi Mellencamp (8-10), and Denise Richards (9-10).

, a total of 268 original episodes of The Real Housewives of Beverly Hills have aired.

Series overview

Episodes

Season 1 (2010–11)

Taylor Armstrong, Camille Grammer, Adrienne Maloof, Kim Richards, Kyle Richards and Lisa Vanderpump are introduced as series regulars.

Season 2 (2011–12)

Brandi Glanville and Dana Wilkey served in recurring capacities.

Season 3 (2012–13)

Grammer departed as a series regular, whilst serving in a recurring capacity. Glanville and Yolanda Hadid joined the cast. Faye Resnick and Marisa Zanuck also served in recurring capacities.

Season 4 (2013–14)

Armstrong and Maloof departed as series regulars. Carlton Gebbia and Joyce Giraud joined the cast.

Season 5 (2014–15)

Gebbia and Giraud departed as series regulars. Eileen Davidson and Lisa Rinna joined the cast.

Season 6 (2015–16)

Kim Richards and Glanville departed as series regulars. Kathryn Edwards and Erika Jayne (then Girardi) joined the cast.

Season 7 (2016–17)

Hadid and Edwards departed as series regulars. Dorit Kemsley joined the cast. Eden Sassoon served in a recurring capacity.

Season 8 (2017–18)

Davidson departed as a series regular. Teddi Mellencamp joined the cast. Grammer served in a recurring capacity.

Season 9 (2019)

Denise Richards joined the cast. Grammer served in a recurring capacity.

Season 10 (2020)

Vanderpump departed as a series regular. Garcelle Beauvais joined the cast. Sutton Stracke served in a recurring capacity.

Season 11 (2021)

Mellencamp and Denise Richards departed as series regulars. Stracke and Crystal Kung Minkoff joined the cast. Kathy Hilton served in a recurring capacity.

Season 12 (2022)

Diana Jenkins joined the cast. Hilton and Sheree Zampino served in recurring capacities.

References

External links
 List of The Real Housewives of Beverly Hills episodes at TV Guide

Real Housewives of Beverly Hills
Beverly Hills Episodes